Prakasha amariformis is a species of harp beetle in the family Carabidae, the only species in the genus Prakasha.

References

Harpalinae
Beetles described in 1892